Tripper may refer to:

Film and television
 Jack Tripper, a main character in the American sitcoms Three's Company and Three's a Crowd
 Tripper Harrison, the character portrayed by Bill Murray in the film Meatballs
 The Tripper, a 2006 film

Music
 Tripper (Efterklang album), 2004
 Tripper (Fruit Bats album), 2011
 Tripper (Hella album), 2011

Other uses
 A train stop safety device in railway signaling
 Tripper (chess), a fairy chess piece